Almácigo Alto is a barrio in the municipality of Yauco, Puerto Rico. Its population in 2010 was 1,659.

Geography 
Almácigo Alto is located northwest of Yauco Pueblo (downtown Yauco), and it is bounded by barrios Almácigo Bajo to the south, Diego Hernández to the east, Collores and Algarrobo to the north, and Susúa Alta to the east.

Demographics

See also

 List of communities in Puerto Rico

References

Barrios of Yauco, Puerto Rico